The Coordinadora Democrática Nicaragüense (Democratic Coordinating Committee, CDN) was a coalition of three right-wing Nicaraguan parties which boycotted the 1984 Nicaraguan general election. The parties were the Social Christians, the (right-wing) Social Democrats, and the Constitutional Liberal Party.

See also
 National Opposition Union
 Arturo Cruz

References

Defunct political parties in Nicaragua
Political party alliances in Nicaragua
1984 in Nicaragua